Pierre Pidgeon is a 1943 picture book by Lee Kingman, with illustrations by Arnold E. Bare. The story is about the title character who has to place a model ship in a new bottle. The book was a recipient of a 1944 Caldecott Honor for its illustrations.

References

1943 children's books
American picture books
Caldecott Honor-winning works